Colegio Once México is a Mexican football Club. They reside in Córdoba, Veracruz. The club currently places in the Tercera División de México.

The team was founded in 2011 and began playing its matches in the Liga de Nuevos Talentos, initially they settled in the municipality of Zapopan, Jalisco, which is part of the Guadalajara metropolitan area. In 2013, the team stopped participating in that league and began to play in the Third Division. 

Between 2015 and 2020, the team registration was rented by other teams. In 2019–20 season the register was used by Cafetaleros de Córdoba. From 2020–21 season the team returns as Colegio Once México Córdoba

Current roster
 Updated on October 4, 2019.

Footnotes

External links
Tercera divicion

Football clubs in Guadalajara, Jalisco
Football clubs in Veracruz
Córdoba, Veracruz